Super Mother is an Armenian romantic comedy film written by Vardan Zadoyan and directed by Arman Marutyan and Vahagn Khachatryan, starring Hayk Marutyan and Ani Khachikyan.  The film was completed in 2014 and was publicly released on March 8, 2015. The sequel, Super Mother 2, was released in 2017.

Plot
A man (Karen) wants to earn some money. Randomly, he meets a boy named Tigran, with whom they agree on a deal. They pretend to be a mother and son to extort money from a famous organization, whom director is Sona.

Cast
 Hayk Marutyan as Karen and Karine Barseghyan
 Garik Papoyan as Menua
 Ani Khachikyan as Sona
 Levon Haroutyunyan as Shef
 Samvel Sargsyan as Davit Sourenich
 Arman Martirosyan as Tigran
 Arpi Gabrielyan as Zara
 Andranik Harutyunyan as Zoub
 Rafayel Yeranosyan as Grandpa Zhme
 Arman Navasardyan as Ashot
 Armine Poghosyan as Noune
 Nerses Hovhannisyan as Tom
 Vruyr Harutyunyan as Usta Hrach
 Armen Sargsyan as Tyush
 Ashot Meloyan as Police officer
 Emma Baykova as little schoolgirl
 Astghik Poghosyan as little Karine

References

External links
 
 Official movie website
 Official Facebook page

2015 films
Armenian comedy films
2015 romantic comedy films
Films shot in Armenia
Hayk Marutyan films